is a town located in Fukushima Prefecture, Japan. , the town had an estimated population of 16,955 in 6051 households, and a population density of 280 persons per km².

Geography
Yabuki is located in the flatlands of south-central Fukushima prefecture, approximately 212 kilometers north of Tokyo. 
Rivers: Abukuma River

Neighboring municipalities
 Fukushima Prefecture
 Shirakawa
 Kagamiishi
 Ishikawa
 Nakajima
 Izumizaki
 Ten-ei
 Tamakawa

Demographics
Per Japanese census data, the population of Yabuki has remained relatively stable over the past 40 years.

Climate
Yabuki has a humid climate (Köppen climate classification Cfa).

History
The area of present-day Yabuki was part of ancient Mutsu Province and the area has many burial mounds from the Kofun period. The area formed part of the holdings of Shirakawa Domain during the Edo period, and had a number of post stations on the Mito Kaidō and the Ōshū Kaidō. After the Meiji Restoration, it was organized as part of Nishishirakawa District in the Nakadōri region of Iwaki Province.

Yabuki Village was formed on April 1, 1889 with the creation of the modern municipalities system. It was elevated to town status on December 1, 1903. The Imperial Japanese Army established an airfield in Yabuki in 1928, which became a major pilot training base in 1937. It was bombed by American forces in August 1945 during World War II.

During the 2011 Tohoku earthquake, over 1800 structures were severely damaged or destroyed, corresponding to approximately 30 percent of the town, the largest percentage of any municipality not affected by a tsunami.

Economy
The economy of Yabuki is primarily agricultural.

Education
Kabuki has four public elementary schools and one public junior high school operated by the town government. There is one public high school operated by the Fukushima Prefectural Board of Education. 
 Yabuki Middle School
 Fukushima Prefectural Konan-Minami High School

Transportation

Railway
JR East – Tōhoku Main Line

Highway

Local attractions
Ayuri Hot Springs

Noted people from Yabuki
Kiyoshi Nakahata, baseball player
Asami Chiba, runner

References

External links

 
Towns in Fukushima Prefecture